Boyer Valley Township is a township in Sac County, Iowa, United States. Early is contained within Boyer Valley Township.

Geography 
The township's elevation is listed as 1316 feet above mean sea level.

It has a total area of 0.39 square miles.

Demographics 
As of the 2010 census, Boyer Valley Township had a population of 775 and 380 housing units.

History 
Boyer Valley Township was founded in 1871. It was named for the Boyer River. Its first resident was likely William Cory, a homesteader, who settled in the area in 1868. The Chicago and North Western Railway used to run through the township. It was once a prosperous farming town, with a greater population than at present.

Education 
Boyer Valley Township is part of the Galva–Holstein Community School District.

References

Townships in Sac County, Iowa
Townships in Iowa